Elachista vastata is a moth in the family Elachistidae. It was described by Edward Meyrick in 1932. It is found in India.

References

Moths described in 1932
vastata
Moths of Asia
Taxa named by Edward Meyrick